Vaninder Kaur Loomba  is an Indian politician. She was a member of Punjab Legislative Assembly between 2012-2017 and represented Shutrana Assembly Constituency.

Family
Loomba is married to Karan Singh.

Political career

Member of Legislative Assembly
Loomba successfully contested election from Shutrana in 2012 and became member of Punjab Vidhan Sabha.

She represented the Shutrana Assembly Constituency until 2022.

In the 2022 Punjab Legislative Assembly election she contested from Shutrana as a member of the Shiromani Akali Dal and was defeated by Aam Aadmi Party's candidate Kulwant Singh Bazigar by a large margin of 51,554 votes.

Electoral performance

References

Living people
Punjab, India MLAs 2012–2017
Year of birth missing (living people)
Place of birth missing (living people)
Shiromani Akali Dal politicians
People from Patiala district
21st-century Indian women politicians
21st-century Indian politicians
Women members of the Punjab Legislative Assembly